The Huelva Ibero-American Film Festival, held since 1975 in Huelva, Spain, is the oldest film festival in Europe dedicated to the Ibero-American cinema.

The festival was originally organised by a private entity, the Cine-Club Huelva.

The festival is chiefly publicly funded. The grand prize is the 'Golden Columbus' for best feature. Other awards include: best director, best male lead, best female lead, best script, best photography and best short film.

Winners of the Golden Columbus 

 1975 Ya no basta con rezar, directed by Aldo Francia 1972 (Chile)
 1976 La última cena, directed by Tomás Gutiérrez Alea (Cuba) and Los traidores, directed by Grupo Cine de la Base (Argentina)
 1977 Cantata de Chile, directed by Humberto Solás 1975 (Cuba)
 1978 Chuvas de Verão, directed by Carlos Diegues (Brazil) and Serenata a la luz de la luna, directed by Carles Jover and Josep Salgot (Spain)
 1979 Julio comienza en julio, directed by Silvio Caiozzi (Chile)
 1980 A culpa, directed by António Victorino d'Almeida (Portugal) and La viuda de Montiel directed by Miguel Littín (México)
 1981 Cerromaior, directed by Luís Filipe Rocha (Portugal)
 1982 Últimos días de la víctima, directed by Adolfo Aristarain (Argentina)
 1983 Ardiente paciencia, directed by Antonio Skármeta (Chile)
 1984 Asesinato en el Senado de la Nación, directed by Juan José Jusid and Los chicos de la guerra, directed by Bebe Kamin (Argentina)
 1985 El Rigor del destino, directed by Gerardo Vallejo (Argentina)
 1986 Pobre mariposa, directed by Raúl de la Torre (Argentina)
 1987 Bésame mucho directed by Francisco Ramalho (Brazil)
 1988 A mulher do próximo, directed by José Fonseca e Costa (Portugal)
 1989 Juliana, directed by Fernando Espinosa and Alejandro Legaspi (Peru)
 1990 , directed by Tristán Bauer (Argentina)
 1991 Las tumbas, directed by Javier Torre (Argentina)
 1992 Adorables mentiras, directed by Gerardo Chijona (Cuba) and El beso del sueño, directed by Rafael Moreno Alba (Spain)
 1993 La estrategia del caracol, directed by Sergio Cabrera (Colombia)
 1994  Reina y Rey, directed by Julio García Espinosa (Cuba)
 1995 Sicario, directed by José Ramón Novoa (Venezuela)
 1996 Como un relámpago, directed by Miguel Hermoso (Spain)
 1997 Como Nascem os Anjos, directed by Murillo Salles (Brazil)
 1998 Traição, directed by Arthur Fortes, Claudio Torres and José Enrique Fonseca (Brazil)
 1999 Garage Olimpo, directed by Marco Bechis (Argentina)
 2000 Coronación, directed by Silvio Caiozzi (Chile)
 2001 En la puta vida, directed by Beatriz Flores Silva (Uruguay)
 2002 Madame Satã, directed by Karim Aïnouz (Brazil)
 2003 El viaje hacia el mar, directed by Guillermo Casanova (Uruguay)
 2004 Whisky, directed by Juan Pablo Rebella and Pablo Stoll (Uruguay)
 2005 Cidade Baixa, directed by Sérgio Machado, (Brazil)
 2006 El violín, directed by Francisco Vargas (México)
 2007 Luz silenciosa, directed by Carlos Reygadas (México)
 2008 La buena vida, directed by Andrés Wood (Chile)
 2009 La Nana, directed by Sebastián Silva, (Chile)
 2010 Hermano, directed by Marcel Rasquin (Venezuela)
 2011 Eu Receberia as Piores Notícias dos Seus Lindos Lábios, directed by Beto Brant and Renato Ciasca (Brazil)
 2012 Clandestine Childhood, directed by Benjamín Ávila
 2013 Workers, directed by José Luis Valle (Mexico)
 2014 Zanahoria, directed by Enrique Buchichio (Uruguay/Argentina)

References

External links 
 

Film festivals in Spain
Recurring events established in 1974
Tourist attractions in Andalusia
Huelva
Ibero-America
Film festivals in Andalusia